Ruijan Suomenkielinen Lehti was a Finnish language weekly newspaper published in Vadsø in Norway.

History and profile
Ruijan Suomenkielinen Lehti was started in 1877 as a weekly newspaper for the Finnish-speaking immigrants in Vadsø and Sør-Varanger. The editor wanted citizens of Finland to buy it as well. The paper was published by the Kven merchant Israel Bergström, with assistance from teacher J. G. Cajan from Helsinki. It had a mix between news, information directed towards Kvens and advertisements.

Ruijan Suomenkielinen Lehti was very controversial in its time. The paper was boycotted by most Norwegian advertisers in the district. Official people in the district, among others the priest and sexton, reportedly vowed to counteract the newspaper. One of the few Norwegians who publicly supported the newspaper's existence was the local politician (later MP) Karl Akre. Ruijan Suomenkielinen Lehti went defunct later in 1877 after 26 issues.

Finnish speakers in the area later imported the magazine Kaiku, published in Oulu.

References

1877 establishments in Norway
1877 disestablishments in Norway
Defunct newspapers published in Norway
Defunct weekly newspapers
Finnish-language newspapers
Mass media in Finnmark
History of Finnmark
Kven culture
Publications established in 1877
Publications disestablished in 1877
Vadsø